Jitendra Singh (born 12 October 1965) is an Indian former cricketer. He played one first-class match for Bengal in 1987/88.

See also
 List of Bengal cricketers

References

External links
 

1965 births
Living people
Indian cricketers
Cricketers from Varanasi
Bengal cricketers